"Endless Nights" is a song by American rock singer Eddie Money, released in 1987 as the third single from his sixth studio album Can't Hold Back (1986). It was written by John Cesario, Michele Collyer and Steve Mullen, and produced by Richie Zito and Money. It reached No. 21 on the Billboard Hot 100 and No. 10 on the Album Rock Tracks chart.

A music video was filmed to promote the single, directed by David Fincher. It achieved heavy rotation on MTV.

Track listing
7" single
 "Endless Nights" – 3:23
 "Bring On the Rain – 4:54

7" single (US promo)
 "Endless Nights" – 3:23
 "Endless Nights" – 3:23

Charts

References

Songs about nights
1986 songs
1987 singles
Eddie Money songs
Music videos directed by David Fincher
Song recordings produced by Richie Zito